The Viscount of Monte Cristo (Spanish: El Vizconde de Montecristo) is a 1954 Mexican comedy film directed by Gilberto Martínez Solares and starring Germán Valdés, Ana Bertha Lepe and Andrés Soler. The film draws some of its plot from Alexandre Dumas's The Count of Monte Cristo with the setting moved to contemporary Mexico. Valdés' films of the era were often distorted, comic versions of classic literature.

Cast
 Germán Valdés as Inocencio Dantés  
 Ana Bertha Lepe as Marga 
 Andrés Soler as Don Facundo Farías  
 Miguel Arenas as Don Miguel  
 Rafael Bertrand as Polito  
 Famie Kaufman as Rosaura 
 Marcelo Chávez as Policia celador 
 Joaquín García Vargas as Lino
 Armando Acosta as Invitado fiesta romana  
 Armando Arriola as Fotógrafo  
 León Barroso as Músico  
 Guillermo Bravo Sosa as Chofer carro fúnebre  
 Silvia Carrillo as Bailarina 
 Julio Daneri as Hombre provoca panico  
 Amalia Gama as Clienta anciana en banco  
 Héctor Godoy as Pianista 
 Leonor Gómez as Mujer en cantina  
 Guillermo Hernández as Prisionero  
 Vicente Lara as Hombre en cantina  
 Lupe Legorreta as Lupita, secretaria  
 Carlos León as Guardia en fiesta romana  
 Salvador Lozano as Detective policía  
 José Ortega as El sapo, prisionero  
 José Pardavé as Chofer carro fúnebre  
 Ignacio Peón as Cliente banco  
 Humberto Rodríguez as Cliente banco  
 Manuel Sánchez Navarro as Cajero de banco 
 Rafael Torres as Preso  
 Manuel 'Loco' Valdés as Hombre en cantina  
 Hernán Vera as Cantinero

References

Bibliography 
 Joanne Hershfield & David R. Maciel. Mexico's Cinema: A Century of Film and Filmmakers. Rowman & Littlefield, 1999.

External links 
 

1954 films
1954 comedy films
Mexican comedy films
1950s Spanish-language films
Films based on The Count of Monte Cristo
Films directed by Gilberto Martínez Solares
Mexican black-and-white films
1950s Mexican films